John H. Frey (born February 8, 1963) is an American real estate broker, businessman and politician. A member of the Republican Party, he served as a member of the Connecticut House of Representatives for the 111th district from 1999 to 2021.

Early life and education 
Frey was born in Greenwich, Connecticut, and raised in Ridgefield. A graduate of Ridgefield High School, he attended Western Connecticut State University.

Career 
Frey served as a member of the Ridgefield Republican Town Committee from 1981 to 1998 and the Republican State Central Committee from 1989 to 2000.

Before winning election to the state House of Representatives, Frey was appointed chairman of the Connecticut Real Estate Commission in 1995 by former Governor John G. Rowland. Frey held the distinct honor as the commission's youngest chairman in state history. Frey was also appointed 'government representative' for the University of Connecticut Business School Center for Real Estate and Economic Studies, a position he still holds.

Republican politics 
In February 2007, Frey was elected as the Connecticut National Committeeman to the Republican National Committee. He was re-elected to a four-year term in June 2008, a second full term in May 2012, third term in 2016 and a fourth term in June, 2020. Mr. Frey was appointed by RNC Chairman Michael Steele to the RNC Redistricting Committee, which is charged with planning for federal redistricting that begins after 2010. In July 2009, he was elected to the RNC Site Selection Committee. The eight member committee was charged with determining the site of the 2012 Republican National Convention (their recommendation of Tampa, Florida, was ratified by the Republican National Committee). Mr. Frey was appointed to the Committee on Arrangements, charged with the planning and oversight of the 2012 Republican National Convention. He has served on the RNC Rules Committee since 2007. He served as Sergeant-at-Arms of the 2016 Republican National Convention.

Frey was the 5th District coordinator for the Bob Dole 1996 presidential campaign and was a delegate to the Republican National Convention in San Diego, California, where he represented the state as a member of the Platform Committee. In 2004, for the third time he was a delegate to the Republican National Convention and again represented Connecticut on the Platform Committee, where he gained approval for language calling for a more transparent Indian tribe recognition process. He was a delegate to the 2008 Republican National Convention and served on the Rules Committee.

Connecticut House of Representatives 
Serving in his eleventh term as Ridgefield's chief advocate in Hartford, Frey was appointed by the House Minority Leader Themis Klarides to serve as Senior Republican Whip. He served on the Finance, Revenue and Bonding Committee; the Bank Committee and Legislative Management Committee. He also served on the state Aging Commission.

Frey has supported measures to improve education for students at all grade levels, to protect benefits of seniors and Veterans residing in Connecticut, to preserve consumers' rights, to reform state government, and to secure pristine areas of open space.

Frey has also been instrumental in securing state aid for local projects in Ridgefield, including the Ridgefield Playhouse, school construction and improvements, the Ridgefield Veterans Community Center, the Aldrich Museum, Tiger Hollow and the Ridgefield Boys & Girls Club. He is largely credited for gaining funding for the  Bennetts Pond State Park.

In February 2008, the State Bond Commission approved $3.25 million to fund 12 unit expansion of Ballard Green senior housing and rehabilitation of 120 units of affordable and senior housing in Ridgefield. Connecticut Governor M. Jodi Rell thanks Rep. John Frey for his perseverance in advocating for funding for the project. In October 2008, he secured an additional $640,000 to cover unanticipated funding shortfalls.

Later career 
In June 2008, he was appointed by President George W. Bush to the President's Commission on White House Fellows.In June 2020, The White House announced that State Representative John H. Frey of Ridgefield was appointed by President Donald Trump to serve on the Advisory Council on Historic Preservation (ACHP).

Awards
2009 Ridgefield Realtor of the Year
2009 CT Republicans Frederick Biebel Lifetime Achievement Award
2008 Legislator of the Year—CT Recreation and Parks Association
2007 Champion of Youth—Ridgefield Boys and Girls Club
2006 Larry Award—Aldrich Museum of Contemporary Art
2006 UCONN Advocate of the Year
2005 Legislator of the Year—Mothers Against Drunk Driving
2004 Citizen Award—Ridgefield Kiwanis

Endorsements
2008 CT Professional Firefighters Association
2008 CT Business and Industry Association
2008 CT Association of Realtors
2008 CT Education Association
2008 CT League of Conservation Voters
2008 CT Police Council #15
2008 Ridgefield Police Association
2008 Ridgefield Open Space Association

References

External links
 
 Official Connecticut General Assembly Website
 State Representative John H. Frey Website
 House Republicans Website
 White House Fellows Website

1963 births
Living people
Republican Party members of the Connecticut House of Representatives
People from Ridgefield, Connecticut
Republican National Committee members
21st-century American politicians